Roger Ball (fl. 1395–1407) of Gloucester was an English politician.

He was a Member (MP) of the Parliament of England for Gloucester in 1395 and 1407.

References

14th-century births
15th-century deaths
14th-century English people
15th-century English people
People from Gloucester
Members of the Parliament of England (pre-1707) for Gloucester